Scott Robertson (born 7 April 1985) is a Scottish football coach and former player, who currently serves as a coach at Dundee. Robertson played as a midfielder for Dundee, Peterhead, Dundee United, Blackpool, Hibernian, Romanian club Botosani, Raith Rovers, Brechin City and Forfar Athletic, and was also formerly the assistant manager of Forfar. He also represented Scotland twice in full international matches.

Playing career

Dundee
Robertson began his career with Dundee, but made his senior debut while on loan at Peterhead, spending the second part of the 2003–04 season at Balmoor. At the start of the following season, he returned to Peterhead on loan, resulting in him spending all of 2004 with the Scottish Third Division side. In January 2005, shortly after returning to Dens Park, he made his Dundee debut, going on to feature in ten matches that season and attracting interest from Craig Levein at Leicester City. Despite the interest, Robertson signed a new deal to keep him at the club until 2008. Following Dundee's relegation from the Scottish Premier League, Robertson became a regular in the First Division, missing just one league match in the 2005–06 season. Robertson maintained his starting place in 2006–07 and in 2007–08, his return of five league goals was his most prolific season.

Dundee United
After rejecting a new contract in April 2008, and with his contract close to expiry, Robertson signed for Dundee's rivals Dundee United on 3 June 2008, with Craig Levein – then in charge at United – getting the player he had tried to sign three years previously. The 23-year-old joined the Tannadice club under freedom of contract and agreed a three-year deal. Dundee openly criticised United about the way they pursued Robertson, stating that United had been "disrespectful" towards their Dee rivals. In September, Robertson scored his first goal, netting in the League Cup victory over Airdrie United. Four days later, Robertson scored his first league goal, netting the third in a 3–0 win over Hearts and by mid-November, had played every minute of United's matches that season. In January, however, an osteitis pubis diagnosis ruled him out for the remaining few months of the season, although he made one substitute appearance in May. After his recovery, Robertson revealed that he credited surgeon David Lloyd for saving his career and revealed it was the hardest moment of his career. He also said that 2009 was his worst year.

In the 2009–10 season, Robertson again started as a regular, featuring in the first four matches of the season before being sent off in the 1–1 draw at Celtic. In October the Dundee director, Calum Melville, publicly stated he was planning to bid £500,000 for the Scotland international in the January transfer window. United, however, were not impressed and threatened to haul him in front of the SFA over these comments. Craig Levein, the United manager, criticised the Dundee director by suggesting he needs tutored in the workings of football. Dundee manager Jocky Scott was also reluctant to sign Robertson, especially not in the near future. During the season, Robertson suffered various injuries, mostly an Inguinal Hernia, which ruled him out for the remaining few months of the season before making his return in late-April against Motherwell. Robertson came on as a substitute in the 2010 Scottish Cup Final win, picking up his first winners medal. After the match, Robertson talked about winning the final and said "It's been a long 18 months and while the Cup Final doesn't make up for all the frustration and pain that I went through, it helps quite a bit. And I'm proud to have played a part in this win and somehow got a winner's medal that I never dreamed could have come my way two months ago.". Shortly after, Robertson signed a 12-month contract extension, that will expire in 2012

In the 2010–11 season, Robertson, once again, started as a regular, featuring more often unlike the last two seasons and managed to survive the season without injuries. Robertson also made two appearances in the Europa League, but Dundee United were eliminated in the qualification round against Greek side AEK Athens. Unfortunately, on 22 January 2011, he was, again, sent off in a 1–1 draw against Kilmarnock.

In the 2011–12 season, Robertson suffered an ankle injury limped out of a pre-season friendly with Forfar Athletic. His injury would cause him to miss the start of the season. He missed the opening game of the season before returning in the following game against Hearts. In mid-October, Manager Peter Houston began negotiating a new deal with Robertson and many other players. On 19 November 2011, Robertson scored his first goal in a 1–0 win over Hearts. It was his first goal in three years. Two months later, on 7 January 2012, in the fourth round of the Scottish Cup, Robertson scored and provided an assist for Gary Mackay-Steven in a 6–2 win over Airdrie United. Later in the season, Robertson scored five more goals in the league, including a winner against Celtic on 6 May 2012. After the match, Robertson said he might stay at Dundee United, although many clubs in England including Birmingham City, Brentford and Blackpool. were interested in him.

Blackpool
On 27 July 2012, he signed a two-year contract with an option for a further year with Blackpool. Upon signing, Robertson said he would like to be as successful at Blackpool as Charlie Adam had been in his spell there. However, it didn't go to plan as his first team opportunities where he spent most of his time at the club on the bench or not in the squad and only made one appearance. Upon leaving Blackpool, Robertson says his time there was 'torture' and that the club had signed him without even seeing him play.

Hibernian
Robertson was released from his contract at Blackpool on 28 January 2013, and signed for Hibernian. Three days after joining the club, Robertson made his debut for Hibs in a 1–0 loss against Ross County. Robertson scored his first goal for Hibs on 15 May 2013, in a 3–1 win against Kilmarnock. He later admitted that he should have scored for Hibs earlier than that, particularly when he missed an easy chance in a Scottish Cup tie against Falkirk. In the 2013 Scottish Cup Final, Robertson was an unused substitute as Hibernian lost 3–0 to Celtic. Despite the loss, Robertson made twelve appearances and scoring once.

In the 2013–14 season, Robertson came on as a substitute in both legs as Hibernian suffered a 9–0 aggregate in Europa League qualifying to Swedish side Malmö, including a 7–0 reverse in the home leg. Robertson scored the club's first goal of the season, in a 1–1 draw against Dundee United on 17 August. Although he continued to be involved in the first team after Terry Butcher became manager, Robertson sustained medial knee ligament damage in February 2014. Robertson made his return to training in mid-April after nine weeks' absence. Butcher was unwilling to risk returning Robertson quickly to the team. Robertson made his first team return on 27 April 2014, in the Edinburgh derby, in a 2–1 loss against Hearts. Robertson started both legs in the playoff against Hamilton Academical, as Hibernian lost 4–2 in a penalty shootout, which resulted in Hibernian being relegated to the Scottish Championship. Despite this, Robertson went on to make thirty-one appearances and scoring once in all competitions. Robertson later reflected that the season had been a "disaster".

In the 2014–15 season, Robertson continued to be in the first team under the management of Alan Stubbs. Robertson scored his first goal of the season on 4 October, in a 1–1 draw against Raith Rovers. He suffered from a broken hand in November, then scored his second goal of the season in a 4–0 win against Rangers on 27 December. Robertson scored two goals in consecutive games in January, in a 5–0 win over Cowdenbeath and a 2–0 win against Queen of the South. Two weeks later on 13 February 2015, Robertson scored his fifth goal of the season, in a 2–0 win at Rangers. Robertson's sixth and last goal of the season came on 22 April, in a 3–1 win over Livingston. Robertson was included in the second playoff match against Rangers, but Hibs lost 2–1 on aggregate. Robertson scored six goals in 41 appearances for Hibs in the 2014–15 season.

Despite being keen to sign a contract at the club, Robertson left Hibs at the end of the season under freedom of contract. Following this, Robertson expressed "devastation" to not be at the club for the next season and was keen to stay, citing his family.

Botosani
Robertson signed for Romanian club Botosani in June 2015, becoming the first Scot to play in the Romanian Liga 1. However, this spell overseas was to last only three months, with Robertson later describing the move as a 'nightmare'.

Raith Rovers
On 3 October 2015, it was announced that Robertson had signed for Raith Rovers. He missed almost all of the 2016–17 season due to a groin injury. His first appearance of the season was in a promotion/relegation play-off match against Brechin City. The game ended in a 3–3 draw and Robertson missed the decisive kick in a penalty shootout, which meant that Raith were relegated to League One.

Brechin City
In June 2018, Robertson announced his retirement from playing as he accepted a coaching position with Dundee United. After a change of ownership and management at United meant that he was allowed to play for another club while coaching with them, Robertson signed for Brechin City in January 2019.

Forfar Athletic
Robertson signed with Forfar Athletic during the 2019 close season. Despite being offered a one-year extension by Forfar in 2020, Robertson decided to prioritise his coaching role with Dundee and declined the offer.

International
On 19 November 2008, Robertson received his first international cap for Scotland in the friendly against Argentina when he came on as a 59th-minute substitute for Barry Ferguson.

Coaching career
Robertson was appointed under-18s coach at Dundee United in June 2018. He took a similar role with Dundee in June 2019.

In June 2021, Robertson was named as the new assistant manager for his former side Forfar Athletic, under former Forfar teammate Gary Irvine. As part of his deal, Robertson would also remain a youth coach with Dundee. Robertson would remain assistant manager of Forfar until the end of the season, where he would leave the role to take a more 'enhanced' position with Dundee.

Personal life
Scott's mother Diane Robertson (née McLaren) was a footballer and Scottish internationalist who played for her country seventeen times during the 1970s.

At the end of 2010–11 season, Robertson got married. Robertson attended Dundee's Braeview Academy, alongside fellow future footballers Garry Kenneth and Charlie Adam.

Career statistics

Honours
Dundee United
Scottish Cup : 1
 2010

References

External links
 Official Dundee United website profile
 London Hearts profile

1985 births
Living people
Footballers from Dundee
Scottish footballers
Association football midfielders
Scotland international footballers
Dundee F.C. players
Peterhead F.C. players
Dundee United F.C. players
Blackpool F.C. players
Hibernian F.C. players
Raith Rovers F.C. players
Scottish Football League players
Scottish Premier League players
English Football League players
Scottish Professional Football League players
Scottish expatriate footballers
Expatriate footballers in Romania
Scottish expatriate sportspeople in Romania
FC Botoșani players
Dundee United F.C. non-playing staff
Brechin City F.C. players
Dundee F.C. non-playing staff
Forfar Athletic F.C. players
Forfar Athletic F.C. non-playing staff